Deh or DEH may refer to:

Geography and places 
Deh (Pakistan), a form of administrative unit
Deh, India, a village in Nagaur, Rajasthan
Decorah Municipal Airport, Iowa, United States
Deh, a village in Bar Kham, Cambodia

Other uses 
Dear Evan Hansen, a 2015/2016 Broadway musical by Pasek and Paul
Dear Evan Hansen (film), a 2021 film adaptation
 Dehwari language, spoken in Pakistan (by ISO 639-3 code)

See also